Sběř is a municipality and village in Jičín District in the Hradec Králové Region of the Czech Republic. It has about 300 inhabitants.

Administrative parts
Villages of Hrobičany and Velešice are administrative parts of Sběř.

References

Villages in Jičín District